RailAmerica, Inc., based in Jacksonville, Florida, was a holding company of a number of short-line railroads and regional railroads in the United States and Canada.

In 2007, RailAmerica was acquired by Fortress Investment Group.  Before that, it traded on the New York Stock Exchange with the ticker symbol RRA. It was relisted in October 2009 with the ticker symbol RA.

On June 30, 2010, the company announced that it had acquired Atlas Railroad Construction, a construction and maintenance company operating in the Northeast and Midwest United States, for US$24 million.

In April 2011, RailAmerica made its first shortline purchase in over five years by initiating a deal with Gulf and Ohio Railways to acquire three Alabama shortlines for $12.7 million.

On July 23, 2012, Genesee & Wyoming Inc. announced that it intended to purchase RailAmerica in a deal valued at $1.39 billion. Approval of the purchase was granted by the U.S. Surface Transportation Board on December 19, 2012. While awaiting the decision, Genesee & Wyoming put RailAmerica control in the hands of a trust. They assumed control on December 28, 2012, and the company was in the process of integration to G&W.

Former subsidiaries
RailAmerica controlled the following railroads. It acquired some through purchase of other holding companies: RailLink Canada in July 1999, RailTex in February 2000, ParkSierra and StatesRail in January 2002, and the rail properties of Alcoa in September 2005.

In addition to those listed below, RailAmerica's prior owner, Fortress Investment Group, purchased the Florida East Coast Railway (FEC) in September 2007 from Florida East Coast Industries.  Although Fortress maintained a level of common control between the two railroads, FEC was never made a formal part of the RailAmerica family, and Fortress did not include FEC in the RailAmerica spinoff.

RailAmerica was founded by Gary O. Marino and John H. Marino in 1986.

References

 RailAmerica (September 9, 2005), RailAmerica Selected to Acquire Four Railroads from Alcoa; Additionally Announces Lease with CSX Transportation for the 48 Mile Fremont Branch. Retrieved September 13, 2005.
 Yahoo Finance, RailAmerica Inc. (RRA). Retrieved September 13, 2005.

External links
Official site 

 
Companies formerly listed on the New York Stock Exchange
Companies based in Jacksonville, Florida
United States railroad holding companies
Canadian railroad holding companies
Genesee & Wyoming
2007 mergers and acquisitions
2009 initial public offerings
2012 mergers and acquisitions